The Joint Mathematical Council (JMC) of the United Kingdom was formed in 1963 to 'provide co-ordination between the Constituent Societies and generally to promote the advancement of mathematics and the improvement of the teaching of mathematics'.

The JMC serves as a forum for discussion between societies and for making representations to government and other bodies and responses to their enquiries. It is concerned with all aspects of mathematics at all levels from primary to higher education.

Members
The participating bodies are

 Adults Learning Mathematics
 Association of Teachers of Mathematics
 Association of Mathematics Education Teachers
 British Society for the History of Mathematics
 British Society for Research into Learning Mathematics
 HoDoMS
 Edinburgh Mathematical Society
 Institute of Mathematics and its Applications
 London Mathematical Society
 Mathematical Association
 Mathematics in Education and Industry
 National Association for Numeracy and Mathematics in Colleges
 National Association of Mathematics Advisers
 National Numeracy
 STEM Learning 
 NRICH
 Operational Research Society
 Royal Academy of Engineering
 Royal Statistical Society
 Scottish Mathematical Council
 United Kingdom Mathematics Trust

The observing bodies are
 Advisory Committee on Mathematics Education
 Department for Education (England)
 Department of Education (Northern Ireland)
 Education Scotland
 National Centre for Excellence in Teaching Mathematics
 Office for Standards in Education
 The Office of Qualifications and Examinations Regulation
 The Royal Society
 Scottish Qualifications Authority
 Welsh Government Education Directorate

Leadership
The Chair of the JMC is Andy Noyes, Professor of Education at the University of Nottingham and is a member of the Royal Society Advisory Committee on Mathematics Education.

References

External links 
 Web site

1963 establishments in the United Kingdom
Mathematics education in the United Kingdom
Mathematical societies
Learned societies of the United Kingdom
Professional associations based in the United Kingdom
Royal Statistical Society